Tim Richardson may refer to:

 Tim Richardson (writer), author and confectionery historian
 Tim Richardson (politician) (born 1988), Australian politician